Jayawantrao Sawant Polytechnic (JSP) is a private technology institute established by Jayawant Shikshan Prasarak Mandal (JSPM) on the second campus at number 58 of Handewadi Road, Hadapsar, Pune, in the Indian state of Maharashtra.  The institute is approved by All India Council of Technical Education (AICTE), and is recognized by the government of Maharashtra.

See also
 Jayawantrao Sawant College of Engineering

References

External links

Educational institutions established in 2004
Engineering colleges in Pune
Information technology institutes
Colleges affiliated to Savitribai Phule Pune University
2004 establishments in Maharashtra